Pseudoegertonia is an extinct genus of prehistoric bony fish that lived during the Maastrichtian age of the Cretaceous period and Danian age of the Paleocene epoch.

See also

 Prehistoric fish
 List of prehistoric bony fish

References

Paleocene fish of Asia
Paleogene fish of North America